Cleobulina (6th century BC) or Eumetis (Εὔμητις) was an ancient Greek poet. She was known for writing riddles, and three riddles attributed to her survive.

According to Athenaeus and Diogenes Laërtius, Cleobulina came from Lindos on the island of Rhodes. She was the daughter of Cleobulus, one of the Seven Sages of Greece. Plutarch says that as a young girl she was a companion of the pre-Socratic philosopher Thales of Miletus, though according to Diogenes Laërtius she was his mother. If either association is accurate, she must have been active at the beginning of the 6th century BC.

Only three riddles attributed to Cleobulina survive. One was clearly well known in antiquity, quoted twice by Aristotle, as well as by Plutarch, Demetrius of Phalerum, and Athenaeus; one survives in quotation by an anonymous philosopher; and the third survives in Plutarch's Moralia. Two are elegiac couplets and the third is a single dactylic hexameter. In antiquity, a larger corpus of riddles were probably attributed to Cleobulina, as Athenaeus mentions a treatise on them by the otherwise unknown Diotimus of Olympene.
 
Two ancient comedies named for Cleobulina are known, though neither survive. The earlier one was written by Cratinus, a writer of Old Comedy; it may have been produced between 451 and 450 BC, as Eusebius says that Cleobulina was especially renowned in that year. The other was by Alexis.

Notes

References

Further reading
 Leon, Vicki.  "Cleobulina," in Uppity Women of Ancient Greece.  (San Luis Obispo:  Tabula Rasa Press, 1989). 
 Fabbro, Elena. "La zampa cornuta dell'asino morto. Il più enigmatico enigma di Cleobulina (fr. 3 West2)", in C. Griggio - F. Vendruscolo (edd.), Suave mari magno.. Studi offerti dai colleghi udinesi  Ernesto Berti. pp. 55–76 (Udine: Forum)

External links
Riddles of Cleobulina with original text
Alternate translation with commentary of the Three Riddles
Project Continua: Biography of Cleobulina Project Continua is a web-based multimedia resource dedicated to the creation and preservation of women's intellectual history from the earliest surviving evidence into the 21st Century.

Ancient Rhodian poets
6th-century BC Greek women
Ancient Greek women poets
6th-century BC Greek people
6th-century BC poets
6th-century BC women writers
6th-century BC writers